Mohammad Shatnawi (born 17 August 1985) is a Jordanian professional footballer who plays as a goalkeeper for Jordanian club Sahab.

Career statistics

International

Honours

Club
Al-Hussein
 Jordan FA Shield: 2005

Al-Faisaly
 Jordan Premier League: 2011–12
 Jordan FA Cup: 2011–12, 2014–15
 Jordan FA Shield: 2011
 Jordan Super Cup: 2012, 2015

References

External links 
 
 Goal.com

Living people
1985 births
Jordan international footballers
Al-Faisaly SC players
Al-Ramtha SC players
Al-Hussein SC (Irbid) players
Jordanian footballers
Association football goalkeepers
Mansheyat Bani Hasan players
Footballers at the 2006 Asian Games
Asian Games competitors for Jordan
Al-Salt SC players
Jordanian Pro League players
Sahab SC players
Ma'an SC players